The 1998–99 season was the 32nd season in the history of RCD Mallorca B and their first ever season in the second division of Spanish football. The team participated in the Segunda División. The season covered the period from 1 July 1998 to 30 June 1999.

Competitions

Overall record

Segunda División

League table

Results summary

Results by round

Matches

References 

RCD Mallorca seasons
Mallorca